Malan Subdistrict is a subdistrict in Shahekou District, Dalian, Liaoning, China.

Administration
There are 14 communities within the subdistrict.

Communities:
Guangchang Community
Xiyuan Community
Hongling Community
Lanyuan Community
Xingfu Community
Lanqing Community
Chuandian Community
Wenyuan Community
Fumin Community
Mantingfang Community
Hengyuan Community
Daqing Community
Xishan Community
Hongfa Community

See also
List of township-level divisions of Liaoning
Shahekou District

References

External links
马栏街道党建网 

Dalian
Township-level divisions of Liaoning
Subdistricts of the People's Republic of China